Yirrkala gjellerupi is an eel in the family Ophichthidae (worm/snake eels). It was described by Max Carl Wilhelm Weber and Lieven Ferdinand de Beaufort in 1916. It is a tropical, freshwater eel which is known from northern New Guinea (Indonesia).

References

Ophichthidae
Fish described in 1916
Endemic fauna of Indonesia
Freshwater fish of Western New Guinea